The 2021–22 Hong Kong Premier League (also known as the BOC Life Hong Kong Premier League for sponsorship reasons) was an abandoned season of the Hong Kong Premier League, the top division of Hong Kong football.

Effects of the COVID-19 pandemic 
On 5 January 2022, the Hong Kong government announced a tightening of social distancing measures between 7 January to 20 January in order to control the Omicron outbreak. Public recreation facilities, such as football pitches, were closed and members of the public were barred from gathering in groups of more than two, making it impossible for the season to continue. The Hong Kong Football Association announced on the same day that it would also postpone any scheduled matches in the successive two week period.

After the measures were extended several times in the following weeks, the government announced on 22 February that it would extend the measures until 20 April, making it nearly impossible to complete the season before most player contracts expired on 31 May. The HKFA held an emergency meeting with the clubs on 25 February, after which it was determined that the remainder of the season would be cancelled.

Teams 
A total of 8 teams contest the league, including six teams from the 2020–21 Hong Kong Premier League, one team promoted from the 2020–21 Hong Kong First Division and one newly established team. Pegasus and Happy Valley decided to self-relegate to amateur leagues due to lack of funds.

Pink denotes a newly promoted/established club entering the league this year.

Stadia and locations 

Primary venues used in the Hong Kong Premier League:

Personnel and kits

Managerial changes

Foreign players 
The number of foreign players is restricted to six per team, with no more than five on the pitch during matches, the fifth player must be a marquee player.

According to the decision made by Hong Kong Football Association Board of Directors on 15 July 2020, the marquee player must fulfil one of the following criteria: 

i) played for a club which is in a world's top professional league of one of the top 50 associations in the FIFA ranking published by FIFA on 11 June 2020 for at least 1 season or ii) fielded by his association in an international match, which his association is one of the top 50 associations in the FIFA ranking published by FIFA on 11 June 2020.

There are no restrictions on the number of foreign players HKFC can register. However, the team must have at least nine Hong Kong players in the squad, with no less than three on the pitch during matches.

HK U23 is not allowed to register any foreign players. Meanwhile, the number of overaged players is restricted to five for the team, with no more than three on the pitch during matches. The rest of the players must meet the registration status of U23 local players.

League table

Results

Positions by round 
To preserve chronological evolvements, any postponed matches are not included to the round at which they were originally scheduled, but added to the full round they were played immediately afterwards. For example, if a match is scheduled for round 7, but then played between rounds 8 and 9, it will be added to the standings for round 8.

Fixtures and results

Round 1

Round 2

Round 3

Round 4

Season statistics

Top scorers

Hat-tricks 
Note: The results column shows the scorer's team score first. Teams in bold are home teams.

Clean sheets

Attendances

Awards

Monthly Most Valuable Player

Remarks

References 

Hong Kong Premier League seasons
Hong Kong
2021–22 in Hong Kong football
Association football events curtailed and voided due to the COVID-19 pandemic